is a former railway station on the former Nanbu Jūkan Railway in Shichinohe, Aomori, Japan.

There was once a plan to use the Nanbu Jūkan Railway to connect the Tōhoku Shinkansen with Noheji or Mutsu, but the railway was closed before the construction of the Tōhoku Shinkansen started.

History
Shichinohe Station opened on 20 October 1962 as the southern terminus of the Nanbu Jūkan Railway. The final services to and from the station were carried out on 6 May 1997 when the railway ceased operations. On 1 August 2002, the station formally closed. The station is currently maintained by the railway enthusiast volunteers and is the headquarters of the Nanbu Jūkan Company.

Layout
The former station had two side platforms serving two tracks.

References

Railway stations in Aomori Prefecture
Defunct railway stations in Japan
Railway stations in Japan opened in 1962
Railway stations closed in 2002
Nanbu Jūkan Railway